Gerda Steinhoff (29 January 1922 – 4 July 1946) was a Schutzstaffel (SS) Nazi concentration camp overseer following the 1939 German invasion of Poland.

SS career 

Steinhoff was born in Danzig-Langfuhr. As a teenager, she worked as house maid on a farm at Tygenhagen near Danzig. From 1939, she worked in a bakery in Danzig and later became a tramway conductor. She married in 1944 and had a child. In the same year, because of the Nazi call for new guards, she joined the camp staff at Stutthof.

On 1 October 1944, Steinhoff became a Blockleiterin, or block leader, in the Stutthof SK-III women's camp. There, she took part in selections of prisoners to be sent to the gas chambers. On 31 October, she was promoted to SS-Oberaufseherin, senior overseer, and assigned to the Danzig-Holm subcamp.

On 1 December 1944, Steinhoff was reassigned to the Stutthof Bromberg-Ost female subcamp located in Bydgoszcz, some 170 km (105 miles) south of Danzig. There, on 25 January 1945, she received a medal for her loyalty and service to the Third Reich. Steinhoff was devoted to her job in the camps and known as a ruthless overseer. Soon before the end of World War II, she fled the camp and returned home.

Arrest, trial and execution 

On 25 May 1945, Steinhoff was arrested and imprisoned by Polish officials. She was tried at the first Stutthof Trial with other Schutzstaffel (SS) female staff and kapos, and was convicted and condemned to death for her involvement in the selections and what was called her sadistic abuse of prisoners. She was publicly hanged with the other ten condemned camp personnel on 4 July 1946 on Biskupia Górka Hill near Gdańsk.

See also 

 Female guards in Nazi concentration camps

References 
Death on the Gallows

1922 births
1946 deaths
Stutthof trials executions
Military personnel from Gdańsk
People from the Free City of Danzig
Executed German women
Filmed executions
Female guards in Nazi concentration camps
Publicly executed people

People executed for crimes against humanity